This is a list of college lacrosse events.

Regular season events
Big City Classic, East Rutherford, New Jersey (2009–2013)
Buckeye Invitational, Columbus, Ohio (1974)
Bucknell Tournament, Lewisburg, Pennsylvania (1993)
Day of Rivals, Baltimore, Maryland (2009–)
Face-Off Classic, Baltimore, Maryland (2007–)
Fleet Tournament, Providence, Rhode Island (1992)
Indian Day Games, Piqua, Ohio (1978–1979)
IKON Classic, Baltimore, Maryland (1998)
Loyola Tournament, Baltimore, Maryland (1982, 1986, 1987, 1990)
McDonald's Invitational, Durham and Greensboro, North Carolina (1985)
Pioneer Classic, Denver, Colorado (2001, 2003, 2006)
Rutgers Invitational, Piscataway, New Jersey (1990)
The First 4, Carson, California (2005), San Diego, California (2006–2007)
Triangle Lacrosse Classic, Durham and Chapel Hill, North Carolina (1989–1993), sponsored by Bank of America/NCNB
UMBC Tournament, Baltimore, Maryland (1989, 1991)
Notre Dame tournament, South Bend, Indiana (1964?–1967?)

Postseason events
NCAA men's lacrosse championships, the Division I, II, and III championship tournaments
North/South Senior All-Star Game – Currently consists of two games, one for Division I and II players, and one for Division III players
ACC men's lacrosse championship, Atlantic Coast Conference
America East men's lacrosse championship, America East Conference
CAA men's lacrosse championship, Colonial Athletic Association
ECAC men's lacrosse championship, Eastern College Athletic Conference
GWLL men's lacrosse championship, Great West Lacrosse League
Ivy League men's lacrosse championship, Ivy League
MAAC men's lacrosse championship, Metro Atlantic Athletic Conference
MLA men's lacrosse championship, Midwest Lacrosse Association
Patriot League men's lacrosse championship, Patriot League

References

College lacrosse in the United States
College
Lacrosse